Rebecca Caine (born 25 November 1959) is a Canadian soprano, and musical theatre performer.

Life and career
Caine was born in Toronto, Ontario and studied at the Guildhall School of Music and Drama in London. She is the daughter of Australian statistician Geoffrey Watson and the granddaughter of British constitutional law scholar Sir William Ivor Jennings. Caine currently resides in London.

Caine's career has been divided between opera and musical theatre. She made her West End debut at the age of 19 in the role of Laurey in Oklahoma!. She then sang the role of Eliza in My Fair Lady on a national tour. While making her debut at Glyndebourne as Amor in L'incoronazione di Poppea, she was asked to join the Royal Shakespeare Company where she created the role of Cosette in Les Misérables.

After a successful West End run, she joined the original cast of The Phantom of the Opera to play Christine opposite Michael Crawford as alternate (performing 2 shows a week) when original Christine Sarah Brightman left the show and was replaced by the original alternate, Claire Moore.

When the rights to a Canadian production of Phantom were secured, producer Garth Drabinsky aggressively pursued Caine to reprise the role in Toronto. Andrew Lloyd Webber, who greatly admired Caine's portrayal of Christine in the London production, also strongly suggested she take the role. At the time, Caine was very close to signing a contract to star in another West End show. Ultimately, she chose Phantom and relocated to Toronto and also spent time in New York in early 1989 for principal cast rehearsals with director Hal Prince.

The Canadian production of The Phantom of the Opera premiered on September 20, 1989, at the restored Pantages Theatre, with Susan Cuthbert playing Christine two performances per week as Caine's alternate. The show broke then box office records for advance ticket sales, and ran for just over ten years. During her run in Toronto, she joined the Canadian Opera Company to make her North American operatic debut in the title role of Alban Berg's Lulu. This led to offers from numerous international opera companies ranging from Claudio Monteverdi to Peter Maxwell Davies, including Pamina, Despina, Susanna, Aminta (Il re pastore), Vixen, Michaela, Musetta, Ophelie, Leila, Marguerite, Violetta, Julietta (Bohuslav Martinů) and Adina for companies such as the Canadian Opera Company, Scottish Opera, English National Opera, Glimmerglass Opera, Spoleto Festival, Opéra de Nice, Vlaamse Opera, New Zealand Opera, National Theatre of Prague, and Opera North. In 2006 she performed as Hanna Glawari in Franz Lehár's The Merry Widow for Opera Holland Park in London in 2006.

In 1996, Caine made a guest appearance on The Future Sound of London's album Dead Cities, performing operatic vocals on the song "Everyone in the World Is Doing Something Without Me".

On October 7, 2006, Caine reunited with her former cast colleagues from the original London production of Les Misérables to sing "One Day More" after a performance in celebration of the show's 21st anniversary making it the longest running musical in the world. The original cast reunited again in 2010 to celebrate the show's 25th anniversary at the O2 Arena in London.

In May 2009, Caine made her Chicago debut in the Chicago Opera Theater's production of Benjamin Britten's Owen Wingrave.

In December 2010, Caine returned to the musical theatre stage as Lady Raeburn in Salad Days produced by Tête à Tête.

In May 2011, Caine played Ottavia in a jazz adaptation of The Coronation of Poppea directed by Mark Ravenhill.

In the summer of 2012, Caine played Baroness Elsa Schraeder in the Sound of Music at the Kilworth House Theatre in Leicestershire. The production also featured Helena Blackman as Maria and Jan Hartley as Mother Abbess.

In March 2013, Caine played Lady Vale in Darling of the Day at the Union Theatre, London, marking the show's UK premiere after an initial 31-performance run on Broadway over four decades previously in 1968.

From November 2014-January 2015, Caine played Katisha in The Mikado at London's Charing Cross Theatre.

In December 2015-February 2016, Caine joined the Asolo Repertory Theatre Company in Sarasota, Florida making her straight acting debut as Raquel De Angellis in Living On Love.

In April 2015, Caine appeared as the Mother Abbess in a production of The Sound of Music in Lebanon. The following year she performed the role in a UK tour of the show from July–September 2016.

Caine appeared at the Sheffield Crucible in the world premiere of the new musical Flowers for Mrs Harris in the role of Lady Dant/Mme. Colbert from May to June 2016.

In addition to her work with opera and theatre companies, Caine continues to perform concerts and solo cabaret performances throughout Britain and North America. Caine has also taught for multiple years at Trinity Laban Conservatoire of Music and Dance in Greenwich.

Caine made her second appearance in a play from February–March 2018 as Mrs Chasen in Harold and Maude, alongside Sheila Hancock and later Linda Marlowe as Maude, at Charing Cross Theatre.

Caine returned to the role of Mother Abbess in The Sound of Music between December 2018-January 2019 at the Pattihio Theatre and Strovolos Municipal Theatre in Cyprus.

From September–October 2019, Caine appeared in the UK premiere of Preludes by Dave Malloy as hypnotherapist Nikolai Dahl at Southwark Playhouse. The cast later reunited in May 2021 for two livestreamed concert performances of the production from the same venue.

During the COVID-19 pandemic, Caine taught independently and also appeared in standalone concerts such as A Merry Little Christmas Celebration at Chichester Festival Theatre in December 2020.

In November 2021, Caine appeared in the 10th Anniversary Concert of Howard Goodall and Stephen Clark's musical Love Story alongside the show's original performers, Michael D Xavier and Emma Williams.

From November 2018, Caine has been involved in the development of Conor Mitchell's opera Abomination: A DUP Opera with the Belfast Ensemble as Irish politician, Iris Robinson. A full staging of the show was mounted in November 2019 at Outburst Queer Arts Festival at the Lyric Theatre in Belfast, where it was filmed and subsequently streamed to worldwide audiences in April 2020. Caine reunited with the ensemble from March–April 2022 to perform the opera at Ireland's national theatre, the Abbey Theatre, and then again at the Lyric Theatre in Belfast.

Caine performed the role of Margaret Johnson in The Light in the Piazza at Central City Opera in Colorado from 2–28 July in 2022.

Between 8 October-5 November, Caine will premiere the role of Magda in Propaganda: A New Musical at the Lyric Theatre as part of the 2022 Belfast International Arts Festival. The new work, devised and directed by Conor Mitchell in a co-production between the Lyric Theatre and the Belfast Ensemble, is set during the Cold War in 1949 in East Berlin and described as a “Soviet love story…embroiled in the chaos of circumstance, art, love and American jazz”. Earlier initial development of the piece included a concert reading in April 2019 at the Lyric, under the title ‘The Young Pornographers’.

Leading Ladies 
In May 2007, Caine released Leading Ladies, a collection of songs paying tribute to past "Leading Ladies of the British Musical Theatre Stage", from Gertrude Lawrence to Julie Andrews, with her then-collaborator and vocal coach Gerald Martin Moore on piano and vocals, playing a selection of their leading men, including Noël Coward.

They created two cabaret shows based on their Leading Ladies concept (the second show is entitled Leading Ladies of Hollywood) and have performed for sold-out crowds throughout the United Kingdom in venues such as the Jermyn Street Theatre in London and the Newbury Festival in Sydmonton.

World premieres 
Caine's world premieres have included: Jezebel, presented by the Toronto Symphony (title role; oratorio by Robertson Davies and Derek Holman); Playing Away, presented by Opera North (role: L.A. Lola; by Howard Brenton and Benedict Mason); The Golden Ass, presented by the Canadian Opera Company (role: Fotis; by Robertson Davies and Randolph Peters); Mr Emmet Takes a Walk, presented by Psappha (6 female roles; by David Pountney and Peter Maxwell Davies); Mathilde, a musical by Conor Mitchell directed by Simon Callow (Edinburgh Fringe Festival); Intolerance, a one-woman opera by Mark Ravenhill and Conor Mitchell presented by Tête-à-Tête.

Performance Credits

Musicals

Opera

Plays

Recordings 
Caine can be heard on numerous recordings including:
  Les Misérables – Original London Cast – 1985
  Anything Goes – London Studio Cast – 1988 (EMI)
  The Phantom of the Opera – Original Canadian Cast – 1990
  Everyone In The World Is Doing Something Without Me (Featured on Dead Cities by The Future Sound of London) – 1996 
  Babes in Toyland – 2001 (Unreleased)
  Mr. Emmet Takes a Walk – 2007
  Leading Ladies – 2007 (Solo debut album with Gerald Martin Moore)
  As Time Goes By (Featured on Dream by Anna O’Byrne) – 2016
  Preludes – 2021 (Concert Pro-shot from Southwark Playhouse)

Broadcasts 
Caine's BBC broadcasts include:

References

External links
 Rebecca Caine's Official Website
   Rebecca Caine's Discography

1959 births
Canadian musical theatre actresses
Canadian operatic sopranos
Living people
Alumni of the Guildhall School of Music and Drama
Actresses from Toronto
Musicians from Toronto
Singers from London